Enhe Russian Ethnic Township is an ethnic township in Northeast Inner Mongolia under the administration of Ergun City. The township along the banks of the Argun River. Enhe is the only ethnic township in China designated for China's Russian minority.

Geography 
The ethnic township shares a  border with Russia, determined by the Argun River.

Flora and fauna 
The ethnic township hosts much undisturbed nature, including large swathes of virgin forests and grasslands. Plants native to Enhe include lingonberries, blueberries, Chinese skullcaps, and dangshen. Animals native to Enhe include the Asian black bear, the Siberian roe deer, the lynx, and the Hazel grouse.

Climate 
On average, Enhe experiences 90 frost-free days per year.

Demographics
As of March 2017, Enhe's population totals 2,339, and is largely Russian and descended from mixed marriages of Han Chinese and Russians. A 2019 publication from the ethnic township's government states that 1,309 of Enhe's 2,339 people, or 55.96% of its total population, is either ethnically Russian or have both Russian and Chinese heritage, whereas a 2021 publication from Ergun's municipal government suggests that 80% of Enhe's population have some Russian lineage. Lonely Planet observes that some of the people in the township "look purely Russian".

Records of marriages between Chinese and Russians in the region date back to the 1890s from the beginning of Russian colonization of Manchuria. Unlike the conventional colonial marriage pattern of Western men marrying native women, the predominant combination in Manchuria was between Russian women and Chinese men. Mixed families are mainly settled along the towns and villages of the Argun River including Enhe, which is the only one of the settlements to be an official ethnic Russian township.

In addition to Russian and Han Chinese populations, Enhe is also home to significant Mongol, Hui, Manchu, Korean, Daur, Oroqen, and Evenk populations.

Economy 
Sizable mineral resources run through the region, including gold, lead, zinc, iron and copper.

Enhe hosts one state-owned ranch and two state-owned tree farms.

Education 
There is one school: Ergun City Enhe Primary School (额尔古纳市恩和小学).

Tourism
Enhe has emerged as a tourism destination noted for its peaceful countryside backdrop. Lonely Planet describes Enhe as "a charming village brimming with an unhurried and authentic atmosphere" where "herders milk their cows outside their properties when they aren't taking them out to pasture". Tourism is also enhanced by the Russian cultural ties of the township including Russian bakeries and buildings with the architectural stylings of traditional Russian wooden cottages. There is also homestay accommodation in Enhe giving a representation of traditional Russian village living.

There were plans to enclose the village and charge an entrance fee, though as of 2023 no such actions have been taken.

See also
Shiwei, Inner Mongolia - Neighboring town

References

Township-level divisions of Inner Mongolia
Ethnic townships of the People's Republic of China
Ergun City
Russian diaspora in China